The 1912 Dartmouth football team was an American football team that represented Dartmouth College as an independent during the 1912 college football season. In its second season under head coach Frank Cavanaugh, the team compiled a 7–2 record, shut out six of nine opponents, and outscored all opponents by a total of 281 to 34. Frederick E. Jennings was hired as the assistant coach for the season. Ray Bennett was the team captain.

Tackle Wesley Englehorn was a consensus first-team pick on the 1912 All-America college football team.

Schedule

References

Dartmouth
Dartmouth Big Green football seasons
Dartmouth football